Pierre Roux-Freissineng (27 May 1863 - 20 December 1952) was a French politician.

He was born in Marseille, and represented the Independent Radicals in the Chamber of Deputies from 1919 to 1933 and as a Senator from 1934 to 1940.

References

1863 births
1952 deaths
Politicians from Marseille
Independent Radical politicians
Members of the 12th Chamber of Deputies of the French Third Republic
Members of the 13th Chamber of Deputies of the French Third Republic
Members of the 14th Chamber of Deputies of the French Third Republic
Members of the 15th Chamber of Deputies of the French Third Republic
French Senators of the Third Republic
Senators of French Algeria